Netawansum is a mythological figure in Mi'kmaq tradition who is the nephew/niece and travel companion of Klu'skap. Netawansum was created by Kisúlk using ocean foam that had been blown onto sweetgrass by the shore. Netawansum possessed knowledge about the life and strength of the maritime world.

During the sixth stage of creation, Netawansum met their uncle Klu'skap and granted him improved vision, including the ability to see great distances; spirit; and body. To celebrate their meeting, Netawansum brought gifts from the ocean to Klu'skap, who in return summoned fish from the ocean and cooked them to make a meal alongside nuts from the trees. Together with Klu'skap and Klu'skap's grandmother Nukumi, they found Klu'skap's mother, Níkanaptekewísqw. This group of four lived together for a long time before Klu'skap decided to leave his mother and nephew/niece and travel north with his grandmother.

A Mi'kmaq ceremony held during council gatherings burns sweetgrass to honour the arrival of Netawansum.

References 

Abenaki mythology
Gods of the indigenous peoples of North America
Mi'kmaq